Tom Gilmore (born May 14, 1948) is a Canadian retired professional ice hockey forward who played a total of 202 games in the World Hockey Association with the Los Angeles Sharks and the Edmonton Oilers.

Early life 
Gilmore was born in Flin Flon, Manitoba. Gilmore played major junior with the Flin Flon Bombers, then was captain of the University of Denver Pioneers hockey team when they won the consecutive 1968 and 1969 NCAA Division I Men's Ice Hockey Tournaments.

Personal life 
Gilmore is married to Collette Gilmore and they have two children, Scott Gilmore, one of the founders of Peace Dividend Trust, and Patrick Gilmore, a film and television actor.

Awards and honors

References

External links

1948 births
Living people
Canadian ice hockey forwards
Edmonton Oilers (WHA) players
Sportspeople from Flin Flon
Los Angeles Sharks players
Tidewater Wings players
Ice hockey people from Manitoba
NCAA men's ice hockey national champions